Delhi Durbar Medals were instituted by the United Kingdom to commemorate the Delhi Durbar where the new Emperor of India was proclaimed, in 1903 for Edward VII, and in 1911 for George V. On both occasions the medals were one and a half inches in diameter and were awarded in both gold and silver. They were worn in date order alongside Coronation and Jubilee medals on the left chest, suspended from a ribbon one and a quarter inches wide. These Royal commemorative medals were worn before campaign medals until November 1918, after which the order of wear was changed, with them now worn after campaign medals and before long service awards.

Delhi Durbar Medal, 1903
Obverse: The crowned head of the king facing right wearing an ermine robe of State, with the Collar of the Garter, and Badge of the Order of the Bath. Below the bust a branch of laurel with, around the rim, the legend,  EDWARD VII DELHI DURBAR 1903.Reverse: Inset within a floral wreath of roses - a Persian inscription reading : By the Favour of the Lord of the Realm Edward, King, Emperor of India, 1901.The medal was awarded unnamed.

140 gold medals were awarded to ruling chiefs and 2,567 in silver to other dignitaries, government officials and members of the armed forces, who were actually involved in the celebrations.

See also
 Delhi Durbar Medal (1911)
 Delhi Durbar
 British colonial India
 Empress of India Medal

References

Orders, decorations, and medals of the British Empire
Orders, decorations, and medals of India
Orders, decorations, and medals of British India
Orders, decorations, and medals of the United Kingdom
1911 establishments in the United Kingdom
1911 disestablishments in the United Kingdom